Alfi or ALFI may refer to:

 Association of the Luxembourg Fund Industry
 Alfi (car manufacturer), a defunct German motor vehicle manufacturer
 Alfi's Syndrome or Monosomy 9p, a rare chromosomal disorder

People

Given name
 Alfi Conteh-Lacalle (born 1985), Spanish–Sierra Leonean football player
 Alfi Kabiljo (born 1935), Croatian musician

Surname
 Hassan Al Alfi (1936–2021), an Egyptian politician

See also
Alfie (disambiguation)